Pingtang Subdistrict is a subdistrict of Yuelu District in Changsha, Hunan, China. It is historically the territory of former Baiquan Township, Taiping Township and parts of the former Pingtang Town in Wangcheng County in 1994. The subdistrict has seven villages and two communities under its jurisdiction. its seat is Shifengshan Village.

History
In 589 AD, Linxiang County was renamed to Changsha County, today's Pingtang Subdistrict was part of Changsha County. From the year 1098 AD, Shanhua County was established from Changsha County, by 1912, Shanhua was incorporated into Changsha County, it belonged to Shanhua County. Pingtang was the former Fulong Town of Changsha County in 1912 and it was part of the 10th District of Changsha County in 1930.

As the Revocation of Districts and Amalgamation of Townships in June 1956, the former Pingguan District was divided into four townships. As the Revocation of Townships and Establishment of Communes in October 1958, the Pingtang People's Commune was formed. County controlled districts were reorganized in July 1961 and the Pingtang District of Changsha County was established, meanwhile the size of the communes was reduced. In December 1962, Lianhua District was created from a part of Pingtang District, Pingtang District had five communes of Pingtang, Baiquan, Taiping, Jiujiang and Xueshi, and Pingtang Town under its administration.

In March 1984, the communes were reorganized to townships, Pingtang District governed five townships and a town. In 1985, the township of Pingtang was merged to the town of Pingtang.

As the Revocation of Districts and Amalgamation of Townships in June 1995, the two townships of Baiquan and Taiping were amalgamated to the town of Pingtang, the township of Xueshi was merged into Jiujiang Township, the newly established town of Pingtang had 35villages and three communities, the township of Jiujiang had 23 villages.

As the Amalgamation of Village-level Divisions of Wangcheng County in 2004, the division of Pingtang Town was reduced to 20 (5 communities and 15 villages) from 38 (3 communities and 35 villages).

On June 15, 2008, the town of Pingtang was transferred from Wangcheng County to Yuelu District. On August 3, 2012, the town of Pingtang was officially reorganized to a subdistrict. On January 18, 2013, the former Pingtang Subdistrict was converted to the two subdistricts of Pingtang and Yanghu. The newly established Pingtang Subdistrict had two communities and 11 villages with an area of 90.13 square kilometers. As a new round of the Amalgamation of Village-level Divisions in 2016, its divisions were reduced to nine from 13, it has two communities and seven villages under its jurisdiction, its seat is Shifengshan Village.

Subdivisions
2 communities
 Guanyingang Community
 Tongxigang Community

7 villages
 Baiquan Village
 Hongqiao Village
 Lianshan Village
 Shifengshan Village
 Shuanghu Village
 Taiping Village
 Xinghe Village

Tourist attractions
Tongxi Temple is a Buddhist temple in the subdistrict.

References

External links
      

Yuelu District
Subdistricts of Changsha